Erica Johansson (born February 5, 1974) is a Swedish former athlete who specialized in the long jump. She is the 1992 World Junior Champion, the 1993 European Junior Champion, and the 2000 European Indoor Champion. She also competed at the 2000 Olympic Games.

Career
Born in Landvetter, Härryda Municipality, Johansson was a promising junior who equalled the Swedish record as a 15-year-old with 6.50 meters, to win European Junior silver in 1989. A year later, she won the silver medal at the 1990 World Junior Championships, jumping 6.50 again. She yet again jumped 6.50 when finishing fourth at the 1991 European Junior Championships, missing out on the bronze medal to Iva Prandzheva on countback.  The highlights of her successful junior career was winning gold medals at the 1992 World Junior Championships with 6.65 metres, and at the 1993 European Junior Championships with 6.56. Her greatest achievement at senior level came at the 2000 European Indoor Championships, where she won the gold medal with a jump of 6.89 metres.

She retired after the 2001 season.

International competitions

Personal bests
Long jump - 6.99 (2000), National record
High jump - 1.78 (1989)
Triple Jump - 13.95 (1999)
100 meters - 11.88 (1997)
200 m - 23.75 (1997)
800 m - 2:21.95 (1989)
100 m hurdles - 13.63 (1998)
400 m hurdles - 58.86 (1994)

External links

1974 births
Living people
Swedish female long jumpers
Olympic athletes of Sweden
Athletes (track and field) at the 2000 Summer Olympics
People from Härryda Municipality
Sportspeople from Västra Götaland County
20th-century Swedish women